Robert Mark Nosofsky (born  1956) is a distinguished professor in the department of psychological and brain sciences at Indiana University Bloomington. He is best known for his exemplar theory, which has diverse applications in cognitive science and psychology. His research interest are categorization, recognition memory, math modeling, combining formal modeling and FMRI Studies. His research is in the development and testing of formal mathematical models of perceptual category learning and representation.

Life and education 
He was born in U.S.A. He graduated with a B.A. in psychology and mathematics at the State University of New York in Binghamton in 1978 and a Ph.D. in psychology at Harvard University 1984.

Exemplar theory 
The exemplar theory, which was proposed by Robert Nosofsky is different from the prototype theory, proposed by Eleanor Rosch, and the demarcator theory, proposed by Taraneh Javanbakht. According to the exemplar theory, the human cognition of concept categories is based on the use of exemplars of concepts. The exemplar theory explains how the human beings learn and use these concept categories.

Awards and honors 
Robert Nosofsky received the first New Investigator Research Award of the Society of Mathematical Psychology (1987), APA's Distinguished Scientific Award for Early Career Contribution to Psychology (1993), and the Troland Award from the National Academy of Sciences (1995). He was elected to the Society of Experimental Psychologists, the leading honorary society in the field, in 1998. In January, he accepted the editorship of the Psychonomic Bulletin & Review, one of the most prestigious theoretical-empirical journals in the field.

Works 
 Nosofsky, R.M., Sanders, C., Meagher, B.J., & Douglas, B.J (2017). Toward the development of a feature-space representation for a complex natural category domain. Behavior Research Methods 
 Nosofsky, R.M., Sanders, C., Gerdom, A., Douglas, B., & McDaniel, M. (2017). On learning natural science categories that violate the family-resemblance principle. Psychological Science, 28, 104-114
 Nosofsky, R.M., & Donkin, C. (2016). Qualitative contrast between knowledge-limited mixed-state and variable-resources models of visual change detection. Journal of Experimental Psychology: Learning, Memory, and Cognition, 42, 1507-1525
 Nosofsky, R. M. (2016). An exemplar-retrieval model of short-term memory search: Linking categorization and probe recognition. Psychology of Learning and Motivation, 65, 47-84

See also 
 Exemplar theory
 Prototype theory

Notes 

American cognitive psychologists
Indiana University people
New York University alumni
Harvard University alumni
Living people
Year of birth missing (living people)
1950s births